Deh Zir (also Romanized as Deh Zīr and Deh-e Zīr; also known as Dehrīz) is a village in Abadeh Tashk Rural District, Abadeh Tashk District, Neyriz County, Fars Province, Iran. At the 2006 census, its population was 567, in 144 families.

References 

Populated places in Abadeh Tashk County